This is a list of airlines currently operating in Tanzania.

See also
 List of airlines
 List of defunct airlines of Tanzania

References

Tanzania
Airlines
Airlines
Tanzania